The Music Academy of the West is a summer classical music training program in Montecito, California, and festival with performances in the County of Santa Barbara.

Overview 
The academy annually enrolls 136 pre-professional musicians in their late teens and early 20s, who receive merit-based full scholarships to workshops led by famous composers, conductors, and artists. Programs of study are vocal piano, voice, collaborative piano, solo piano, and instrumental. The eight-week summer music festival consists of concerts and operas, as well as public master classes with famous musicians.

History 
The first impulse to establish a summer music festival in the Santa Barbara County came from soprano Lotte Lehmann in 1940. In 1947 the Music Academy of the West was founded by Southern California arts patrons, musicians, conductors and composers. In addition to Lotte Lehmann, founders of the academy were conductor Otto Klemperer, violinist Roman Totenberg, harpsichordist Rosalyn Tureck, baritone John Charles Thomas and composers Ernest Bloch, Darius Milhaud, Roy Harris and Arnold Schoenberg, who served as the academy's first composer in residence.
Among the first scholarship funders were singer-actors Jeanette MacDonald and Nelson Eddy, violinist Jascha Heifetz and movie producer Daryl F. Zanuck.

The academy first hosted its summer sessions at Cate School in Carpinteria, before starting to relocate to a 10 acre (c. 4 hectare) property in Montecito in 1951. The former Montecito Country Club, regarded a showcase garden of Montecito and named Miraflores ("see flowers" in Spanish,) has been the academy's campus since the summer of 1952, though students had to be housed at sorority and fraternity houses at the University of California, Santa Barbara for several years. Since 2016 accommodations are at Westmont College.

From 1954 to 1980 the academy's music director was Maurice Abravanel. Martial Singher was head of the Voice Department from 1962 till 1981. Marilyn Horne, who had attended the academy in 1953 was named director of the voice program in 1997 and remained in this position till 2018. In 2018, Horne became the honorary voice program director.
Since 2010, the academy has held the annual Marilyn Horne Song Competition, formerly known as the Marilyn Horne Foundation Vocal Competition.

In the same year, Scott Reed became the academy's president and chief executive officer. Past presidents have included David Kuehn and NancyBell Coe.

In 2014, the Music Academy of the West began an educational partnership with the New York Philharmonic. Under the collaboration, music director Alan Gilbert and orchestra members maintained residencies in Santa Barbara during parts of the festival, and selected Music Academy fellows trained with orchestra members in Santa Barbara and New York City.

In 2018, the academy launched a four-year partnership with the London Symphony Orchestra with music director Simon Rattle, and a free after school choral program called Sing! for children ages 7–11 taking place in elementary schools in Santa Barbara County. Participants perform at the Music Academy of the West and collaborate with the London Symphony Orchestra. The academy partnered with the UC Santa Barbara to preserve historic audio and video recordings of concerts, masterclasses and recitals held at the academy. In 2017, 400 early recordings have been digitized, among them recordings of Lotte Lehmann, Marilyn Horne, and Jerome Lowenthal.

In 2022 the academy celebrated its 75th anniversary and adopted a new logo with simply the words Music Academy, the legal name remained Music Academy of the West. The academy consulted professional publicity and marketing agencies from New York and Los Angeles for the rebranding. The brand makeover was deemed necessary because of the loss of weight of the long-standing moniker and the acronym MAW. The new logo was intended to reference sun rays and the circle of fifths, whereas the old logo was referencing floral shapes.

Alumni 
Alumni of the Music Academy of the West, called fellows, are former attendants of the conservatory programs. Many of them fill important professional music positions around the world, performing in top-tier orchestras, opera houses, and teaching on music school faculties. Others have gone on to leadership roles in other institutions. Notable alumni include:

Voice 

 Lucine Amara (1947)
 John Brancy (2013)
 Grace Bumbry (1956, 1957, 1958)
 Sasha Cooke (2002)
 Benita Valente (1953, 1955, 1956, 1957)
 Juan Diego Flórez (as Juan Florez, 1995)
 Rodney Gilfry (1981)
 Donald Gramm
 Kay Griffel (1958)
 Thomas Hampson (1978, 1979)
 Megan Marie Hart (as Megan Hart, 2010)
 Marilyn Horne (1953)
 Robert W. Jensen (as Robert Jensen, 1949)
 Isabel Leonard (2005)
 Kathryn Lewek (2009)
 Lotfi Mansouri (1957)
 Simone Osborne (2008, 2009, 2011)
 Susanna Phillips (2002, 2003)
 Rinat Shaham (1995, 1996, 1997)
 Nadine Sierra (2007)
 Riki Turofsky (1970)
 Erin Wall (2000)
 William Workman (1965)

String instruments

Violin 

 Pamela Frank (1983, 1984)

Viola 

 Donald Weilerstein (1955)
 Jan Karlin (1975, 1976)
 Cynthia Phelps (1979, 1983)

Cello 

 Catherine Hewgill (1981)
 Jeffrey Solow (1964, 1965, 1966)

Double Bass 

 Orin O'Brien (1952, 1953, 1955)

Wind instruments

Horn 

 Barry Carl (1966, 1967, 1971)

Trumpet 

 Anthony Plog (1968)

Tuba 

 Jeffrey Anderson (1982)

Clarinet 

 David Shifrin (1968)

Bassoon 

 Benjamin Kamins (1968, 1969)

Piano 

 Burt Bacharach (1950)
 James Newton Howard (1967, 1969)
 Martin Katz (1964)
 Paul Schenly (1964, 1965, 1969)

Conducting 

 Jung-Ho Pak (1989)
 David Wiley (1990)

Other students 
Music students using the facilities for music training or performing with visiting orchestras without being enrolled are not considered alumni. Among those students are:

 Susan Allen (with the Santa Barbara Youth Theatre, 1963)
 Judith Beckmann (singing lessons with Harold Reed and Lotte Lehmann)
 Katy Perry (singing lessons at facilities)

Sources

References

External links
 

Music schools in California
Classical music festivals in the United States
Music festivals in California
Tourist attractions in Santa Barbara County, California
Music Academy of the West
Organizations based in Santa Barbara County, California
Montecito, California
Westmont College